Relatives is a 1985 Australian film about a family reunion.

References

External links

1985 films
1985 drama films
Australian drama films
1980s English-language films
1980s Australian films